Stratiomys is a genus of flies in the family Stratiomyidae.

Species
Stratiomys adelpha Steyskal, 1952
Stratiomys annectens James, 1941
Stratiomys apicalis Walker, 1854
Stratiomys approximata Brunetti, 1923
Stratiomys armeniaca Bigot, 1879
Stratiomys badius Walker, 1849
Stratiomys barca Walker, 1849
Stratiomys browni Curran, 1927
Stratiomys canadensis Walker, 1854
Stratiomys cenisia Meigen, 1822
Stratiomys chamaeleon (Linnaeus, 1758)
Stratiomys concinna Meigen, 1822
Stratiomys conica Fabricius, 1805
Stratiomys constricta Walker, 1860
Stratiomys currani James, 1932
Stratiomys diademata Bigot, 1887
Stratiomys equestris Meigen, 1835
Stratiomys fenestrata Gerstaecker, 1857
Stratiomys floridensis Steyskal, 1952
Stratiomys heberti Oustalet, 1870
Stratiomys hirsutissima James, 1932
Stratiomys hulli Steyskal, 1952
Stratiomys jamesi Steyskal, 1952
Stratiomys japonica Wulp, 1885
Stratiomys laetimaculata (Ôuchi, 1938)
Stratiomys laevifrons (Loew, 1854)
Stratiomys leucopsis Wiedemann, 1830
Stratiomys longicornis (Scopoli, 1763)
Stratiomys longifrons Rondani, 1848
Stratiomys meigenii Wiedemann, 1830
Stratiomys melanopsis Wiedemann, 1830
Stratiomys nevadae Bigot, 1887
Stratiomys nigrifrons Walker, 1849
Stratiomys norma Wiedemann, 1830
Stratiomys nymphis Walker, 1849
Stratiomys ohioensis Steyskal, 1952
Stratiomys pallipes Fabricius, 1781
Stratiomys pellucida Rondani, 1848
Stratiomys pentadiscalia Statz, 1940
Stratiomys portschinskyana Nartshuk & Rozkošný, 1984
Stratiomys potamida Meigen, 1822
Stratiomys reducta Nerudova, Kovac & Rozkošný, 2007
Stratiomys singularia (Harris, 1778)
Stratiomys tularensis James, 1957
Stratiomys validicornis (Loew, 1854)
Stratiomys velutina Bigot, 1879
Stratiomys ventralis Loew, 1847
Stratiomys virens Wiedemann, 1830

References

Stratiomyidae
Brachycera genera
Taxa named by Étienne Louis Geoffroy

Diptera of North America

Diptera of Asia
Diptera of Europe